Scoparia acharis is a moth of the family Crambidae. It was named by Edward Meyrick in 1884. Meyrick gave a description of the species in 1885. This species is endemic to New Zealand.

Description 

The wingspan is 17.5 mm. The forewings are whitish-ochreous, irrorated with fuscous and dark fuscous. There is a sharply defined oblique black spot from the base of the costa. The first line is indicated only by an obscure dark posterior margin, followed on the costa by a sharply-defined moderate triangular black spot. The terminal area is suffused with brownish-ochreous and there is a cloudy, ochreous-whitish subterminal line with a row of ochreous-whitish marks. The hindwings are very pale whitish grey.

Adults have been recorded on wing in January.

References

Moths described in 1885
Moths of New Zealand
Scorparia
Endemic fauna of New Zealand
Taxa named by Edward Meyrick
Endemic moths of New Zealand